The Oak Park Journal was a weekly newspaper for Oak Park, Illinois. It was published by Suburban Journals of Chicago, Inc. Ed Vincent was the editor.

References

External links
Official website

Journal
Oak Park Journal
Weekly newspapers published in the United States